The  is a railway line in Japan, operated by Kyushu Railway Company (JR Kyushu). It connects Jōno Station in Kitakyushu, Fukuoka Prefecture with Yoake Station in Hita, Ōita Prefecture and features the 4380 m Shakadake Tunnel between Chikuzen Iwaya and Hikosan station, where a fatal tunnel collapse occurred during construction in 1953, killing 21 construction workers. The line is named after Hita and Mount Hiko.

Stations
●: Stops, ｜: non-stop

History
The Toyo-shu Railway Co. opened the Tagawa-Ita - Buzen Kawasaki section as part of the Tagawa Line in 1899. That company merged with the Kyushu Railway Company in 1901, which extended the line to Soeda in 1903. The company was nationalised in 1907.

The Jono - Tagawa-Ita section was opened in 1915 by the Kokura Railway Co., that company being nationalised in 1943. The Soeda - Daigyoji section opened between 1937 and 1946, and the Daigyoji - Yoake section opened in 1956.

CTC signalling was introduced on the entire line in 1984. Freight service ceased beyond Tagawa-Gotōji in 1986, and totally in 1999.

Typhoon damage
On 5 July 2017, torrential rainfall resulted in the closure of the section of the line between Soeda and Yoake. The damage was severe and included the destruction of several bridges and parts of the track being washed away. The line remained disconnected as of the start of 2020. On 12 February 2020, it was proposed by JR Kyushu to not restore the rail service, due to low passenger use and high maintenance costs, and permanently replace it with bus rapid transit (BRT). JR Kyushu has formally announced that agreements have been made with local authorities, and the line will be replaced with BRT. The BRT route is estimated to be completed by 2023.

Former connecting lines
Buzen Kawasaki Station: The 26 km Kamiyamada Line opened from Iizuka (on the Chikuho Main Line) to Shimoyamada in 1898, extended to Kamiyamada in 1929 and to Buzen Kawasaki (as a passenger-only section) in 1966. Freight services ceased in 1980, and the line closed in 1988. This line had two connections:
 A 2 km  gauge line from Okuma (16 km from Buzen Kawasaki) - Okumamachi operated between 1924 and 1933. 
 The 8 km Urushio line from Shimokamoo (14 km from Buzen Kawasaki) - Shimayamada (connecting to the Gotoji Line) opened in 1943, and closed in 1986.

Soeda station - The Ogura Railway Co. opened a line to Ipponmatsu in 1915. The line was nationalised in 1943 and closed in 1985.

References

This article incorporates material from the corresponding article in the Japanese Wikipedia.

Lines of Kyushu Railway Company
Rail transport in Fukuoka Prefecture
Rail transport in Ōita Prefecture
Railway lines opened in 1899
1899 establishments in Japan